is a Japanese footballer currently playing as a defender for Ventforet Kofu.

Career statistics

Club
.

Notes

Honours

Club 
Ventforet Kofu
Emperor's Cup: 2022

References

External links

1996 births
Living people
Sportspeople from Ibaraki Prefecture
Association football people from Ibaraki Prefecture
Toyo University alumni
Japanese footballers
Association football defenders
J3 League players
J2 League players
AC Nagano Parceiro players
Ventforet Kofu players